Tino is an Italian name or nickname, often a diminutive of the names Agostino, Costantino, Martino, Antonino, Valentino, Giustino, Sabatino, Faustino, and other names ending in -tino.

Tino may refer to:

People

Given name
 Tino Ausenda (1919–1976), Italian racing cyclist
 Tino Berbig (born 1980), German football-goalkeeper
 Tino Best (born 1981), West Indian cricketer
 Tino Bianchi (1905–1996), Italian actor
 Tino Bonk (born 1967), German bobsledder
 Tino Boos (born 1975), German ice hockey player
 Tino di Camaino (1280–1337), Italian sculptor
 Tino Caspanello (born 1960), Italian playwright, actor and director
 Tino Edelmann (born 1985), German Nordic combined skier
 Tino Ellis (born 1997), American football player
 Tino Fiumara (1941–2010), Italian-American mobster
 Tino Häber (born 1982), German javelin player
 Tino Hanekamp (born 1979), German journalist
 Tino Lagator (born 1987), Croatian footballer
 Tino de Lara (1917–?), Filipino actor
 Tino Mewes (born 1983), German actor
 Tino Mohaupt (born 1983), German sports shooter
 Tino Pattiera (1890–1966), Croatian tenor
 Tino Pietrogiovanna (born 1950), Italian alpine skier
 Tino Rodríguez, Mexican-American painter
 Tino Sabbadini (1928–2002), French road bicycle racer
 Tino Sanandaji (born 1980), Kurdish-Swedish economist and author
 Tino Schaedler (born 1972), German film director
 Tino Schirinzi (1934–1993), Italian actor and stage director
 Tino Schmidt (born 1993), German footballer
 Tino Scicluna, American soccer player
 Tino Scotti (1905–1984), Italian film actor
 Tino Sehgal (born 1976), British-German artist
 Tino Semmer (born 1985), German footballer
 Tino Sunseri (born 1988), Canadian football quarterback
 Tino Tabak (born 1946), Dutch-New Zealand cyclist
 Tino Thömel (born 1988), German former road cyclist
 Tino Vegar (born 1967), Croatian water polo player
 Tino Villanueva (born 1941), American poet and writer
 Tino Weber (born 1970), German backstroke swimmer
 Tino Wenzel (born 1973), German sports shooter

Nickname
 Alberto Costa (footballer), Spanish footballer commonly known as Tino
 Tino (footballer, born 1967), Santomean footballer and football manager
 Tino (footballer, born 1988), Cape Verdean footballer
 K-Tino (born 1966), real name Cathérine Edoa Ngoa, Cameroonian singer
 Faustino Asprilla (born 1969), former Colombian footballer commonly known as Tino
 Tino, real name Constantino Fernández Fernández, member of Spanish children's band Parchís
 Tino, real name Étienne Boué Bi, known by the pseudonym Tino, singer, musician, member of Ivorian band Magic System
 Tino Buazzelli (1922–1980), Italian film actor
 Tino Carraro (1910–1995), Italian actor
 Tino Casal (1950–1991), Spanish singer-writer and producer
 Tino Ceberano (born 1942), Australian karateka
 Tino Conti (born 1945), Italian road cyclist
 Tino Coury (born 1988), American singer-songwriter
 Tino De Angelis (born 1915), American commodities trader
 Altino Domingues (born 1951), Portuguese-American retired soccer defender
 Tino Folgar (1892–1983), Spanish operatic tenor
 Tino García (1935–2015), Nicaraguan–Puerto Rican comedic actor
 Tino di Geraldo (born 1960), French-Spanish percussionist born Faustino Fernández Fernández
 Tino Insana (1948–2017), American actor, director, writer and film producer
 Tino Kadewere (born 1996), Zimbabwean footballer
 Tino Lettieri (born 1957), Italian football goalkeeper
 Tino Martinez (born 1967), first baseman in Major League Baseball
 Tino Mawoyo (born 1986), Zimbabwean cricketer
 Tino Nuñez (born 1984), American soccer player
 Tino Petrelli (1922–2001), Italian photographer
 Tino Rossi (1907–1983), Corsican singer

Ring name
 Tino Sabbatelli, a ring name of American professional wrestler Sabatino Piscitelli (born 1983)

Surname
 Ionatana Tino

Places
 Cupertino, California, United States
 Cupertino High School, referred to as Tino
 Tino (island), an Italian island

Other uses
 Typhoon Tino, a list of storms
 Tino Corp., a record company
 Tino (elephant), a famous elephant in Lai Chi Kok Zoo in Hong Kong
 Nissan Almera Tino, a compact MPV
 Tino, a character on the TV drama My So-Called Life
 TINO, also known as MEX3D, an RNA-binding protein

See also
 Tina (given name)
 

Lists of people by nickname
Hypocorisms